Valley Council may refer to:

 Brazos Valley Council of Governments, a voluntary association of cities, counties and special districts in the Brazos Valley region of Central Texas
 Lower Rio Grande Valley Development Council, a voluntary association of cities, counties and special districts in the Rio Grande Valley region of southern Texas
 Valley Council, an individual local government in Australia
 Valley Council (Wisconsin)

See also

 Valley Regional Council